The Men's 1 × 4 km + 2 × 5 km relay cross-country skiing competition of the Vancouver 2010 Paralympics was held at Whistler Olympic Park in Whistler, British Columbia. The competition was held on Thursday, March 20,.

It was the first time a Men's 1 × 4 km + 2 × 5 km Relay was held at the Paralympics, although a men's 1 × 3.75 km + 2 × 5 km relay had been held in Torino 2006, and a men's 1 × 2.5 km + 2 × 5 km relay in Salt Lake 2002.

Each team used three skiers with a disability. It was an open class event, open for standing, visually impaired and sitting classifications. An athlete with a visual impairment has a sighted guide (class B1, B2, optional for B3). Guides are an integral part of cross-country skiing for athletes with a visual impairment, and are medal contenders.

Results

See also
Cross-country skiing at the 2010 Winter Olympics – Men's 4 × 10 kilometre relay

References

External links
2010 Winter Paralympics schedule and results, at the official website of the 2010 Winter Paralympics in Vancouver

Men's 1 x 4 km + 2 x 5 km Relay
Winter Paralympics